The 2010–11 Harvard Crimson women's ice hockey team will represent Harvard University in the 2010–11 NCAA Division I women's ice hockey season.

Offseason
September 17:Three Crimson players (two former) have made the U.S. Women's Select Team roster that will compete in the Four Nations Cup in November 2010. Julie Chu and Caitlin Cahow are the two Crimson alumni. Sophomore Josephine Pucci has been named as a member of the team. Katey Stone will be the head coach of Team USA.

Exhibition

October 23: The Harvard women's hockey team took a 2-1 lead into the third period but allowed a goal for a 2-2 tie at Bright Hockey Center. McGill took advantage of a five-on-three situation early in the first period as Cathy Chartrand took a feed from Gillian Ferrari and beat Bellamy for a 1-0 lead. Harvard had several opportunities on the power play in the 17th minute, but could not score on McGill netminder Andrea Wickman. With less than a minute to play in the game, McGill pulled its goaltender. With an extra skater, Ann-Sophie Bettez and Leslie Oles almost scored. In the end, Katia Clement-Hydra converted from close range to tie the score at 2-2. The overtime stanza did not result in a game-winning goal.

Regular season
Crimson skater Liza Ryabkina from Ukraine scored three goals in two games to open the season. Against archrival Yale. This weekend, Ryabinka scored two goals. Her second goal came with 14 seconds left in regulation and forced overtime. The second game was versus the Brown Bears and Ryabkina scored in the second period.
January 15: A pair of quick goals to start the third period was all the offense the Crimson required. The Bright Hockey Center saw the defense preserve a 2-1 victory over St. Lawrence.
January 22: In front of a crowd of prominent alumnae and Harvard Olympians, the women's hockey team collected its fourth consecutive win. The Crimson defeated Union by a 4-0 tally at Bright Hockey Center. Gina McDonald netted her first collegiate goal in the game.

Standings

Schedule

Conference record

Player stats

Skaters

Goaltenders

Postseason

NCAA tournament

Awards and honors
Liza Ryabkina, Harvard ECAC MLX Skates Player of the Week (Week of November 2, 2010)
Josephine Pucci, 2010-11 New England Women's Division I All-Stars

ECAC honors
Jillian Dempsey, 2010-11 All-ECAC honors

Ivy League honors
Jillian Dempsey, 2010-11 All-Ivy League second-team honors

References

External links
Official Site

Harvard Crimson women's ice hockey seasons
H
H
Harvard Crimson women's ice hockey
Harvard Crimson women's ice hockey
Harvard Crimson women's ice hockey
Harvard Crimson women's ice hockey